Mellin de Saint-Gelais (or Melin de Saint-Gelays or Sainct-Gelais; c. 1491 – October, 1558) was a French poet of the Renaissance and Poet Laureate of Francis I of France.

Life 
He was born at Angoulême, most likely the natural son of Jean de Saint-Gelais, marquis de Montlieu, a member of the Angoumois gentry.  His forename was the French-Norman malapropism of the British wizard Merlin featured in Arthurian legends. He was close to his uncle Octavien de Saint-Gelais (1466–1502), bishop of Angoulême since 1494, himself a poet who had translated the Aeneid into French.

Mellin, who had studied at Bologna and Padua, had the reputation of being doctor, astrologer and musician as well as poet. He returned to France around 1523, and soon gained favour at the court of the art-loving Valois ruler Francis I by his skill in light verse. He was made almoner to the Dauphin, abbot of Reclus in the diocese of Troyes and librarian to the king at Blois.

He enjoyed immense popularity until the appearance of Joachim du Bellay's Défense et illustration... in 1549, where Saint-Gelais was not excepted from the scorn poured on contemporary poets. He attempted to ridicule the innovators by reading aloud the Odes of Pierre de Ronsard with burlesque emphasis before Henry II, when the king's sister, Marguerite de Valois, seized the book and read them herself.

Ronsard accepted Saint-Gelais's apology for this incident, but Du Bellay satirized the offender in the Poète courtisan. He translated the Sofonisba of Gian Giorgio Trissino (1478–1550) which was represented in 1556 before Catherine de' Medici at Blois.  Saint-Gelais was the champion of the style marotique (see Clément Marot) and the earliest of French sonneteers. He died in Paris in 1558.

References

 Becker, Philipp August: Mellin de Saint-Gelais : eine kritische Studie. - Wien : Hölder-Pichler-Tempsky, 1924. - 101 p. - (Sitzungsberichte / Akademie der Wissenschaften in Wien, Philosophisch-Historische Klasse ; 200, 4)
 Dictionnaire des lettres françaises / publ. sous la dir. du Cardinal Georges Grente .... - Paris : Fayard (6 volumes)
 Vol. 3: Le XVIe siècle. - Ed. revue et mise à jour / sous la dir. de Michel Simonin. - 2001. - XLII, 1217 p. - 
 Molinier, Henri Joseph: Essai biographique et littéraire sur Octovien de Saint-Gelays, évêque d'Angoulême (1468-1502). - Rodez: Carrère, 1910. - XXI, 307 p. - (Toulouse, Fac. des lettres, thesis of 1910)
 Molinier, Henri Joseph: Mellin de Saint-Gelays : études sur sa vie et sur ses oeuvres. -  Rodez :  Carrère, 1910. -  XXXII, 614 p. - (Toulouse, Univ., doctoral thesis, 1910). - (also as a reprint in Geneva publishing house Slatkine, 1968)
 Saint-Gelais, Mellin de: Oeuvres poétiques françaises / Éd. établie, présentée et annot. par Donald Stone . - Paris : Soc. des Textes Français Moderne (2 volumes)
 Vol. 1: 1993.- XXIX, 312 p. - (Société des Textes Français Modernes ; 198). - 
 Bol. 2: 1995.- XV, 348 p. - (Société des Textes Français Modernes ; 204). - 
 Stone, Donald: Mellin de Saint-Gelais and literary history. - Lexington, Kentucky : French Forum, 1983. - 127 p. - (French Forum monographs ; 47). - 
 Wagner, Ernst Winfried: Mellin de Saint-Gelais, E. litteratur- u. sprachgeschichtliche Untersuchg. - Ludwigshafen :  printed by A. Lauterborn, 1893. - 149 p. - (Heidelberg, Phil. Fak., doctoral thesis, 9. December 1893)
 Zilli, Luigia: presentation of the tragedy Sophonisba, in Enea Balmas and Michel Dassonville (dir.), La tragédie à l'époque d'Henri II et de Charles IX, Première Série, Vol. 1 (1550-1561), 2d print, Florence and Paris, 1989, pp. 237-250. (Contains in particular a bibliographical starting point on the life of Mellin de Saint-Gelais and all of his work.)

External links 
 Jean-Marie Poirier: Mellin de Saint-Gelais, poète, musicien vocal & instrumental, Homepage of a guitarist and lutenist 
 Olga Bluteau: Mellin de Saint-Gelais: Poésie amoureuse, Homepage of a musician (born July 12, 1964) from Brétigny sur Orge, Département Essonne 
 Lettres Charentaises: Mellin de Saint-Gelais 
 Poésie française: Mellin de Saint-Gelais (28 poems and sonnets) 
 Michael George Haldane: An overview of the sonnet in France in the 16th century (Visiting Fellow, Department of Literature, University of Essex)
 
 

1490s births
1558 deaths
Writers from Angoulême
French poets
French male poets
French medical writers